The name United Rhodesia Party and the acronym, URP, refer to two political parties in Southern Rhodesia.

The first was the party, led by Sir Godfrey Huggins, and which in 1933 came to power in the colony. It was informally known as the United Party. In 1957 it merged with the Federal Party to become the United Federal Party (UFP).

The second is the party founded and led by former UFP premier of Southern Rhodesia, Sir Garfield Todd, during the time in which Southern Rhodesia was one of three territories within the Central African Federation (CAF). This revived URP, which stood to the left of the more centrist UFP, merged with the latter in 1958 following Todd's defeat in the Territorial elections and the victory of the UFP, led at the time by Sir Edgar Whitehead.

References

Defunct political parties in Zimbabwe
Political parties in Rhodesia
Liberal parties in Zimbabwe